The women's heptathlon at the 2008 Summer Olympics took place between August 15  and 16 at the Beijing National Stadium.

The qualifying standards were 6,000 points (A standard) and 5,800 points (B standard).

Schedule
All times are China standard time (UTC+8)

Records
Prior to this competition, the existing world and Olympic records were as follows:

No new world or Olympic records were set for this event.

Overall results
Key

* Ukraine's Lyudmila Blonska originally won the silver medal, but was disqualified after she tested positive for methyltestosterone. Russia's Tatyana Chernova, who inherited the bronze medal following Blonska's disqualification was herself disqualified after a retest of her 2008 drug sample was found to contain metabolites of turinabol.

Notes

References
 Official final classification
 Schedule

Heptathlon
2008
2008 in women's athletics
Women's events at the 2008 Summer Olympics